The Pagan River (Warraskoyak) is a  tributary of the James River located in Isle of Wight County, Virginia. The colonial seaport town of Smithfield (and its National Register-listed Smithfield Historic District) sits on the banks of this river.

Formed about three miles north of Smithfield, the river runs narrow until it is joined by Cypress Creek. The Pagan then opens to a large expanse of wetlands and marsh before bottle-necking into the James River.
Unlike many of the tributaries along the James, it is largely untouched by development — 88 percent of its watershed is a mix of forest, pasture, grasslands and wetlands, according to a 2001 report by the U.S. Geological Survey.

The Pagan, however, played an integral role in the growth of Smithfield, a town of approximately 8,000 people best known for producing Virginia hams. First settled in 1634, Smithfield became an important Hampton Roads trading port. Peanut warehouses lined the river banks until a 1921 fire prompted the industry to shift to Suffolk.
Founded 15 years later, Smithfield Foods soon took its place as the town's economic engine. Following years of expansion, it is now the world's largest pork producer and processor. Its headquarters occupy a sizable portion of the town's waterfront.

Yet unlike other inland waterways, such as the Hampton River, the Pagan remains largely pastoral. In 2000 about 18,000 people lived in its watershed, according to the USGS. The Hampton River, less than half the Pagan's length, had a population of nearly 75,000 at the same time.

The name of the river may come from the Algonquin language word for pecan (Cree pakan, Ojibway pagan, Abenaki pagann) "that which is cracked with a tool" referring to the nut.  When the area was explored in the early 17th century there were many pecan trees along the banks.

See also
List of rivers of Virginia

References

Rivers of Virginia
Tributaries of the James River
Rivers of Isle of Wight County, Virginia